Walter Trehearn is an American former Negro league first baseman who played in the 1940s.

Trehearn made his Negro leagues debut in 1944 with the Chicago American Giants, and played for the Birmingham Black Barons the following season.

References

External links
 and Seamheads

Year of birth missing
Place of birth missing
Birmingham Black Barons players
Chicago American Giants players
Baseball first basemen